Epipsestis dubia is a moth of the family Drepanidae first described by Warren in 1888. It is found from Kashmir to northern Vietnam and Taiwan (including India, Pakistan, China).

Subspecies
Epipsestis dubia dubia (India, Pakistan, Nepal, Myanmar, Vietnam, China: Hunan, Tibet)
Epipsestis dubia chengshinglini Laszlo & G.Ronkay, 2000 (Taiwan)

References

Moths described in 1888
Thyatirinae